Mosammat Mishrat Jahan Moushumi (born 8 June 2001) is a Bangladeshi professional women's footballer who plays as a midfielder or winger for both the Bangladesh Women's Football League club Bashundhara Kings Women and the Bangladesh women's national football team. Currently, she is the captain of the Bangladesh women's national U19 team which won the 2018 SAFF U-18 Women's Championship. She was also the member of AFC U-14 Girls' Regional Championship – South and Central winning Bangladesh U-14 team in Nepal in 2015. She played all matches at 2017 AFC U-16 Women's Championship qualification which held in Dhaka, Bangladesh.

Early years 
Mishrat Jahan Moushumi was born on 8 June 2001 in Palichara, Rangpur.

Playing career 
Moushumi first played in 2011 Bangamata Sheikh Fazilatunnesa Mujib Gold Cup Football Tournament for Palichara Primary Govt. School, Rangpur and they were runner up that year. She also played in 2012 Bangamata Sheikh Fazilatunnesa Mujib Gold Cup Football Tournament where they became champion. Then, she selected for Bangladesh U14 team.

Club career

Bashundhara Kings

2020–present: A historic league success 

Bashundhara Kings Women announced the signing of Mishrat Jahan Moushumi at the mid January 2020, who plays for Bangladesh women's national football team as midfielder who is also the captain of the Bangladesh women's U19 team. For her, it's the first experience to play for any league in home or overseas. She Played her debut match as a starting XI player against Begum Anwara Sporting Club in the 2020 Bangladesh Women's Football League at 22 February 2020. She also scored her first goal in league at 40th minute and she scored her second goal one minute later at 41st minute of 1st half of that match, they won that match by 12–0. But, On 16 March 2020, Bangladesh Football Federation (BFF) postponed all Bangladesh Premier League and Women's Football League matches until 31 March due to COVID-19, till the league started again, she stayed with her family at home. After the league start again, in 24 Nov 2020, she also scored two goals at 5th minute and 18th minute of the match against MK Gallactico Sylhet. She generally plays as a midfielder, but she also played as a winger occasionally for the team in 2020 season. She played all the match in 2020 Bangladesh Women's Football League. They became unbeaten champion in the much waited 2020 season of Bangladesh Women's Football League which held after six year.

International career

2013–17: Success at youth level 
Moushumi was selected to the Bangladesh U16 team for the 2015 AFC U-16 Women's Championship qualification – Group B matches in 2014. Bangladesh participated in the AFC U-14 Girls' Regional Championship – South and Central held in Nepal in 2015. Moushumi was selected to the Bangladesh U14 women's team for that coming tournament. 

She also played all the matches of AFC U-14 Girls' Regional Championship – South and Central, which held in Nepal in 2015, where Bangladesh U-14 Girls' became Champion. Bangladesh women's national U16 football team played the qualifier for the 2017 AFC U-16 Women's Championship. And, she played all the matches in 2017 AFC U-16 Women's Championship qualification – Group C, where Bangladesh became group C champion. Being group C champion, Bangladesh U16 team have qualified for the 2017 AFC U-16 Women's Championship, which held in Thailand in September 2017.

2018–19: SAFF U-18 Women's & Bangamata U-19 Women's International Gold Cup 
Mishrat Jahan Moushumi was named the captain of the Bangladesh women's national U19 team. Under her captaincy they won the 2018 SAFF U-18 Women's Championship and Bangamata U-19 Women's International Gold Cup in 2019. She later played in the 2019 AFC U-19 Women's Championship qualification.

2014: Senior team debut, SAFF Women's Championship semi-final 
In recognition of her achievements with the age level, Moushumi was selected to Bangladesh women's national football team for 2014 SAFF Women's Championship. Bangladesh were in the Group A, where they became the Group A runners-up, so they entered the Knockout stage and end as a semi-finalist.

2016–2018: South Asian Games - Bronze and SAFF final 
Moushumi was selected to Bangladesh women's national football team for 2016 South Asian Games, where they became third in the women's football category and won Bronze. Also she was in the team for 2016 SAFF Women's Championship.Bangladesh were in the Group B. She played two of the group B matches and being group B unbeaten champion, Bangladesh demolish Maldives 6-0 to barge in the semi-final into SAFF Championship final where they lost against India and became Runner-up. And in 2018, she also played in the 2020 AFC Women's Olympic Qualifying Tournament.

2019–present: SAFF Women's Championship semi-final 

Moushumi was selected for 2019 SAFF Women's Championship. Bangladesh were in the Group A. She played two of the group A matches. Moushumi scored the first goal for Bangladesh in the 46th minute from a header win against Bhutan by 2-0 in 2019 SAFF Women's Championship which advanced Bangladesh through to the semi-finals with a match in hand. She also played the second group match against Nepal as a starter. In semi-final Bangladesh did face India where they lost that match.

International Goals

Honours

Club 
Bashundhara Kings Women

 Bangladesh Women's Football League
 Winners (2): 2019–20, 2020–21

International 
SAFF Women's Championship
Runner-up : 2016
South Asian Games
Bronze : 2016
SAFF U-18 Women's Championship
Champion (1): 2018
Bangamata U-19 Women's International Gold Cup
Champion trophy shared (1): 2019
AFC U-14 Girls' Regional C'ship – South and Central
Bangladesh U-14 Girls'
Champion : 2015

References

External links 
 Mishrat Jahan Moushumi on AFC
 
 

2001 births
Living people
Bangladeshi women's footballers
Bangladesh women's international footballers
Bashundhara Kings players
Bangladesh Women's Football League players
Women's association football midfielders
People from Rangpur District
South Asian Games bronze medalists for Bangladesh
South Asian Games medalists in football